Sorokhaibam Ranjana Chanu (born 10 March 1999) is an Indian international footballer who plays as a defender for the India women's national team.

International career
Ranjana scored her first goal for national team against Vietnam in a friendly on 6 November 2019.

International goals

Honours

India
 SAFF Women's Championship: 2019
 South Asian Games Gold medal: 2019

Gokulam Kerala
Indian Women's League: 2021–22
AFC Women's Club Championship: third place 2021

KRYPHSA
Indian Women's League runner-up: 2019–20

References

External links
 Sorokhaibam Ranjana Chanu at All India Football Federation

Living people
Footballers from Manipur
Sportswomen from Manipur
Indian women's footballers
India women's international footballers
India women's youth international footballers
Women's association football defenders
Kryphsa F.C. Players
Gokulam Kerala FC Women players
1999 births
Indian Women's League players
South Asian Games gold medalists for India
South Asian Games medalists in football